Akata Woman is a 2022 young adult fantasy novel by Nigerian American author Nnedi Okorafor. it is the sequel to Akata Witch and Akata Warrior and the third book in The Nsibidi Script series which debuted on the New York Times best seller list following the release of the novel.

Plot
Set after the events of the second book, Sunny Nwazue who discovered that she is a member of the all female Nimm Warriors is tasked by Udide, a giant talking spider to find and return a ghazal stolen by Chichi's mother or face terrible consequences. Sunny, Orlu, Chichi, and Sasha will have to travel across the wilderness—spirit realm, Nimm village, and a parallel universe of plant-based technology to stop Udide from wreaking havoc on the Nimm women.

Reception
The book was ranked as one of the most anticipated book of January 2022 by several magazines and literary websites including Polygon, PopSugar,  Book riot and Tor.com. It received several positive receptions from reviewers. In a starred review, Kirkus Reviews called the novel "An engrossing addition to a thoughtful coming-of-age series". Murad Mahvesh in a review for Tor.com noted that "The story zips along with plenty of fun twists and turns, scares and surprise, and as usual, Okorafor pulls no punches with current social commentary".

References 

Nigerian fantasy novels
American fantasy novels
2022 fantasy novels
2022 American novels
American young adult novels
Young adult fantasy novels
Novels set in Nigeria
Novels by Nnedi Okorafor
2022 Nigerian novels
Viking Press books